A Cage of Eagles is a 1989 thriller by James Follet, taking place at 1941 in the POW Camp at Grizedale Hall at England's Lake District, where some of the most capable of the German officers captured by Britain were kept (and constantly plotted escape).

Plot introduction
The book centers on the battle of wits and the ambiguous relationship developing between U-boat ace Otto Kruger, leader of the captured Germans, and Ian Fleming in his real-life World War II role as an intelligence officer which would later inspire the James Bond books. It ends in December 1941, with an open-ended conclusion clearly leaving the possibility of a sequel. However, for many years afterwards Follet wrote on other subjects, only in 2004 coming up with the long-delayed sequel A Forest of Eagles - followed immediately by a final volume of what became a trilogy, Return of the Eagles.

Allusions and references

Allusions to actual history
The camp depicted existed in reality, and much of the book is based on real-life information gathered by Follet in the course of writing an earlier book, the 1979 novel U-700.

1989 British novels
American thriller novels
Novels set in the Lake District
Fiction set in 1941
Novels set during World War II
1989 American novels
Routledge books